Carl L. Nordly (August 30, 1901 – February 1990) was a head men's basketball coach at the University of Minnesota. Nordly started his coaching career at Carleton College, where he played collegiately.  In 1935, Nordly became a professor at Minnesota and in 1942, following the first retirement of Dave MacMillan, took over as Gophers head coach.  He coached the team from 1942 to 1944 and had a 17–23 career record.  Nordly remained a professor at Minnesota until 1955.  Nordly's coaching style was heavily indebted to Walter Meanwell, former coach of the Wisconsin Badgers.

References

1901 births
1990 deaths
American football halfbacks
Basketball coaches from Minnesota
Carleton Knights baseball players
Carleton Knights football players
Carleton Knights men's basketball players
Minnesota Golden Gophers men's basketball coaches
Northern Illinois Huskies baseball coaches
University of California, Berkeley faculty
University of Minnesota faculty
People from Red Wing, Minnesota
Players of American football from Minnesota
American men's basketball players